The 1940–41 season was Manchester United's second season in the non-competitive War League during the Second World War.

Many of Manchester United's players went off to fight in the war, but for those who remained, the Football League organised a special War League. It was originally split into two regional divisions (Manchester United were placed in the North Division), with 36 clubs involved and positions were decided on goal average. Home and away games were not recognised as such and no points were awarded for draws or wins. United finished the league season with a record of 14 wins, 8 draws and 13 losses, and a goal average of 1.231, good enough for eighth place. To replace the FA Cup, a War League Cup was also set up, in which United lost to Everton in the First Round.

War League North Regional League

War League Cup

References

Manchester United F.C. seasons
Manchester United